Blue is an unincorporated community and census-designated place in Bryan County, Oklahoma, United States. It is named after the nearby Blue River. As of the 2010 census it had a population of 195. Its post office was established on July 1, 1874.

At the time of its founding, Blue was located in Blue County, Choctaw Nation.  In 1886 that portion of Blue County was joined by portions of Atoka County and Kiamitia County to form Jackson County.  Jackson County's western border was the Blue River, just west of the village of Blue.

Demographics

References

Census-designated places in Bryan County, Oklahoma
Census-designated places in Oklahoma